Patrick Schulz (born August 11, 1980) is a professional wrestler under the ring names "Handsome" Patrick Schulz and "Made in Germany" Patrick Schulz. He is working in Europe and also wrestled for Total Nonstop Action Wrestling (TNA) and USA Championship Wrestling in the United States.

Career
Schulz started bodybuilding at the age of fifteen and wrestling at the age of sixteen. He had four years of Muay Thai and Vale Tudo from ages eighteen to twenty-two. He obtained a pro card in 1999 with the ISWF in France.

Schulz was part of the ten-day NWA Germany tournament in 2001 in Bremen and the ISWF Reunion Pro Tour 2002. He spent six month in the USA, Nashville, Tennessee (2003), with regular appearances at TNA, USA Championship Wrestling, High Impact Wrestling (Texas). He was part of the EWP Zypern Pro Tour 2005. He had a wrestling match at a game of Frankfurt Galaxy/NFLE 2007. Moreover, he was in the German Championships 2007 for Catch Wrestling Norddeutschland.

Afterward, he worked as a personal trainer and model for the fitness band.

Other media
Schulz has also worked as an actor for German television, including:

Alexander Hold (as Richie "the wild animal" Miller)
Alpha Team (Episode 96)
Lenßen & Partner
Stubbe – Von Fall zu Fall (Episode "Harte Kerle" as himself)

Championships and accomplishments
ACW
ACW German Championship (1 time)
EWF
EWF Dragonhearts Championship (2 times)
GWU
GWU Heavyweight Championship (1 time)
PWA
PWA Junior Championship (1 time)

External links
Official website

1980 births
German male professional wrestlers
Living people
German bodybuilders
German male models